Singh Better Than King is the tenth studio album, and his first religious album, by the Punjabi singer Babbu Maan, released on 16 November 2009. The album was also released in the USA, Canada and the UK.

The album was preceded by the lead single, "Ik Baba Nanak Si". The song was Mann's first religious single. Following the success of the single, "Marno Mool Na Darde" was released and was also successful. The album received good reviews.

Track listing

References

2009 albums
Babbu Maan albums